Kole Nedelkovski (Bulgarian and ) was a Macedonian revolutionary and poet,  and member of the Bulgarian Communist Party. He was a member of the Macedonian Literary Circle and he published two poetry books. Today, Nedelkovski is seen as one of the founders of the modern Macedonian poetry.

Biography
He was born in Vojnica, near Veles, Ottoman Empire as Nikola Krảstev Nedelkov. Hunted from the Serbian police he emigrated to Bulgaria in 1933. In Sofia, Nedelkovski joined the Macedonian Literary Circle. Later, he became a member of the Bulgarian Communist Party. In the summer of 1941 he joined an illegal group of the Bulgarian Communist Party and came under police scrutiny. He exercised with subversive cases in his capacity as a member of the Central Military Commission at the Central Committee of the BCP. Nedelkovski ended his life escaping the police in Sofia in 1941, by jumping from an attic window.

Works
His poem "A Voice from Macedonia" (Glas od Makedonija) is one of the most famous revolutionary poems in the Macedonian literature. His poetry describes the difficult life of the Macedonian people prior to World War II and glorifies the communist ideas and fight against capitalism. Nedelkovski's poems were published in Skopje-Veles dialect.

Nedelkovski published two poetry books:

 "Lightnings" (Мъскавици, Mӑskavici) - published in 1939
 "On Foot Around the World" (Пеш по светот, Peš po svetot) - published in August 1941.

See also

 Macedonian writers
 Macedonian literature

References

External links
 Kole Nedelkovski on the Macedonian Wikisource.
 A letter by Kole Nedelkovski to Sergej Misirkov regarding Krste Misirkov and his work.
 Short biography of Kole Nedelkovski

1912 births
1941 deaths
Bulgarian communists
Yugoslav communists
Macedonian poets
Yugoslav poets
20th-century Bulgarian poets
Bulgarian male poets
Suicides by jumping
1941 suicides
Yugoslav emigrants to Bulgaria